The following is an incomplete list of species in the agaric genus Lepiota. The genus has a widespread distribution, and contains about 400 species.  Some species, such as L. aspera, have now been separated off into the newer genus Echinoderma.

Lepiota abruptibulba Murrill – Cuba
Lepiota acerina Peck – New York
Lepiota acicularis Velen. – Czech Republic
Lepiota adusta (E. Horak) E. Horak – New Zealand
Lepiota aeruginea Murrill – Florida
Lepiota affinis Velen. –
Lepiota alba Beeli  – Congo
Lepiota albiceps Pat. & Gaillard – Venezuela
Lepiota albida Massee – Singapore
Lepiota albocitrina Pat. – Tonkin
Lepiota albofibrillosa Cleland – Australia
Lepiota albosericea Henn. – Germany
Lepiota albosquamosa Rick – Brazil
Lepiota allenae Peck – Massachusetts
Lepiota alliciens (Berk.) Sacc. – India
Lepiota alluviina (Peck) Morgan – New York
Lepiota alopochroa (Berk. & Broome) Sacc.
Lepiota altissima Massee – India
Lepiota amanitiformis Murrill – USA
Lepiota amanitoides Beeli – Congo
Lepiota amara Beeli – Congo
Lepiota amplifolia Murrill – Oregon
Lepiota amyloidea Singer – Altai
Lepiota amylospora Malençon – 1970
Lepiota ananya T.K.A. Kumar & Manim. – India, Kerala State
Lepiota anax (Berk.) Sacc. – India
Lepiota anceps Rick– Brazil
Lepiota andegavensis Mornand –
Lepiota anomala Murrill – Florida
Lepiota anthomyces (Berk. & Broome) Sacc. – Sri Lanka
Lepiota anupama T.K.A. Kumar & Manim. – India, Kerala State
Lepiota apalochroa (Berk. & Broome) Sacc.
Lepiota apatelia Vellinga & Huijser – The Netherlands
Lepiota apicipigmentata A.B. Pereira – Brazil
Lepiota araucariicola A.B. Pereira – Brazil
Lepiota arenicola Peck – New York
Lepiota areolata Wichansky – Czechoslovakia
Lepiota argentina Raithelh. – Argentina
Lepiota aspera (Pers. : Fr.) Quél. (= Echinoderma asperum (Pers.) Bon)
Lepiota aspericeps Murrill – Florida
Lepiota asperiformis Murrill – Florida
Lepiota asperula G.F. Atk. – USA
Lepiota aspratella Murrill – Jamaica
Lepiota atra Beeli – Congo
Lepiota atrata E. Horak – New Caledonia
Lepiota atricapilla Sacc. – South Africa
Lepiota atrocrocea (Massee) W.G.Sm. – United Kingdom
Lepiota atrodisca Zeller – Oregon
Lepiota atrorupta Rick – Brazil
Lepiota atrosquamulosa Hongo – Japan
Lepiota atrovinosa S. Imai – Japan
Lepiota aucta (Berk. & M.A. Curtis) Sacc. – Hong Kong
Lepiota aurantiaca Henn. – Java, Indonesia
Lepiota aurantioflava Hongo – Japan
Lepiota aureoconspersa Rick – San Salvador
Lepiota aureofloccosa Henn.
Lepiota aureoviolacea Henn. – Cameroon
Lepiota aurora Murrill – Florida
Lepiota australiana Fr. – Australia
Lepiota azalearum (Murrill) Dennis – Florida
Lepiota azurea Singer – Argentina
Lepiota babruka
Lepiota babruzalka
Lepiota bickhamensis
Lepiota boertmannii (= Echinoderma boertmannii)
Lepiota boudieri
 Lepiota brunneoincarnata
 Lepiota brunneolilacea
Lepiota calcarata
Lepiota calcicola = Echinoderma calcicola
Lepiota carinii = Echinoderma carinii
 Lepiota castanea
Lepiota castaneidisca
Lepiota cingulum
 Lepiota clypeolaria
Lepiota coloratipes – Europe, China
Lepiota cortinarius
Lepiota coxheadii
Lepiota cristata
Lepiota cristatanea J.F.Liang & Zhu L.Yang – China
Lepiota cystophoroides
Lepiota echinacea = Echinoderma echinaceum
Lepiota echinella
Lepiota efibulis = Echinoderma efibulis
Lepiota erminea
Lepiota exstructa
Lepiota felina
Lepiota forquignonii
Lepiota fuscovinacea
Lepiota geogenia
Lepiota grangei
Lepiota griseovirens
Lepiota harithaka
 Lepiota helveola
Lepiota hymenoderma
Lepiota hystrix = Echinoderma hystrix
 Lepiota ignivolvata
Lepiota jacobi = Echinoderma jacobi
Lepiota kuehneri
Lepiota lilacea
Lepiota locquinii
Lepiota maculans
Lepiota magnispora
Lepiota medullata
Lepiota mesomorpha
Lepiota micropholis
Lepiota neophana
Lepiota nigromarginata
Lepiota nigrosquamosa
Lepiota nirupama
Lepiota obscura
Lepiota ochraceofulva
Lepiota oreadiformis
Lepiota parvannulata
Lepiota perplexa = Echinoderma perplexum
Lepiota phaeoderma Vellinga – USA
Lepiota phlyctaenodes
Lepiota pseudoasperula = Echinoderma pseudoasperulum
Lepiota pseudolilacea
Lepiota punjabensis N.J. Kaur, M. Kaur and N.S. Atri – India
Lepiota purpurata
Lepiota rubella = Echinoderma rubellum
Lepiota rufipes
Lepiota saponella M.Bodin & Priou – France
Lepiota sardoa (Padovan & Contu) Vila & Castellón - Italy
Lepiota shveta
Lepiota spheniscispora
Lepiota subalba
Lepiota subgracilis
 Lepiota subincarnata
Lepiota thiersii
Lepiota tomentella
Lepiota vellingana
Lepiota viridigleba
Lepiota xanthophylla
Lepiota zalkavritha

References

General references
Vellinga E. (29 November 2010). "Nomenclatural Overview of Lepiotaceous Fungi (Agaricaceae) Version 4.8" (PDF)

Lepiota
Lepiota species, List of